Cerro Alconcha is an andesitic volcano in the Andes. These ignimbrites constrain the volcano's age as older than 9.3 mya.

References 

Extinct volcanoes
Volcanoes of Chile
Volcanoes of Antofagasta Region